The Two-Gun Man is a 1926 American silent Western film directed by David Kirkland and starring Fred Thomson, Spottiswoode Aitken and Olive Hasbrouck.

Plot
A returning World War I veteran, Dean learns his father is having trouble with cattle rustlers and mortgage payments. The problems take their toll on his father and he passes away. He vows vengeance, however, a woman he rescued from an ambusher persuades him against murder. Instead, he steals back his cattle from the thieves and sells them to the chief rustler before turning over the gang to the sheriff.

Cast

References

Bibliography
 Donald W. McCaffrey & Christopher P. Jacobs. Guide to the Silent Years of American Cinema. Greenwood Publishing, 1999.

External links
 

1926 films
1926 Western (genre) films
American black-and-white films
Films directed by David Kirkland
Film Booking Offices of America films
Silent American Western (genre) films
1920s English-language films
1920s American films